Colin John Burgess (born 16 November 1946) is an Australian rock musician who was the drummer in The Masters Apprentices from 1968 to 1972. He was later the original drummer with hard rock band AC/DC between November 1973 and February 1974. The Masters Apprentices had top 20 singles chart success with "5:10 Man", "Think about Tomorrow Today", "Turn Up Your Radio" and "Because I Love You". In 1998 The Masters Apprentices, with Burgess, were inducted into the ARIA Hall of Fame. He has performed in various bands with his brother, Denny Burgess, on bass guitar and vocals, including His Majesty.

Biography

Early career
Colin John Burgess was born on 16 November 1946, Sydney and grew up with his brother Denny. He was the drummer for The Untamed with Joe Travers on guitar in Sydney. In 1965, Denny was an early bass guitarist and vocalist of surf-instrumental band The Throb. In 1967 Burgess and Denny formed psychedelic group Honeybunch with Travers and Bill Verbaan on bass guitar (ex-Morloch). Later that year they were renamed as The Haze.

The Masters Apprentices

Late in 1965 The Masters Apprentices had formed in Adelaide as a pop, rock band, in early 1967 they relocated to Melbourne and by late that year their career had reached a critical juncture. Both their drummer Steve Hopgood and lead guitarist Tony Sommers were disenchanted with the band's erratic fortunes, so founding member Jim Keays decided to replace them. In Sydney, the Burgess brothers met Keays when The Haze supported The Masters Apprentices at a gig in suburban Ashfield. In January 1968, Keays reorganised The Masters Apprentices with Summers and Hopgood departing, and Burgess was flown to Melbourne as the new drummer. Keays then approached Doug Ford, an electric guitarist from The Missing Links and its offshoot Running Jumping Standing Still. In May 1970 the group with Glenn Wheatley on bass guitar relocated to London but had little commercial success there. Wheatley left in late 1971 and by early 1972 Keays announced his own departure and his intention to return to Australia immediately. Ford and Burgess decided to keep going and they sent for Burgess' brother Denny, who took over on bass guitar and lead vocals. The final trio line-up soldiered on for a few months, and made one recording, "Freedom Seekers"—appearing on Jam It Up! in 1987—before finally splitting in mid-1972. During Burgess' tenure, The Masters Apprentices had top 20 singles chart success on the Go-Set National Top 40 with "5:10 Man", "Think about Tomorrow Today", "Turn Up Your Radio" and "Because I Love You".

AC/DC

Burgess returned to Australia and, in November 1973, he was recruited for the formation of hard rockers AC/DC. He joined Malcolm Young on rhythm guitar, his brother Angus on lead guitar, Dave Evans on lead vocals and Larry Van Kriedt on bass guitar. Burgess was sacked in February 1974 for being drunk on stage; he later claimed that someone had spiked his drink. He was replaced by a succession of drummers before Phil Rudd joined in February–March 1975. When Rudd injured his hand in a fight in Melbourne in September 1975, Burgess was recalled as his replacement for a few weeks. In a twist of fate, Burgess was at The Music Factory in London on the night Bon Scott died in February 1980, and was one of the last people to speak with him before he left the club.

Later career

In 1983 Burgess and Denny formed hard rock band His Majesty with Japanese singer Yukiko Davis and Spike Williams on guitar. Though the band folded in 1988, in 1993 another lineup under that name was invited by Regular Records to cut an album with Tiny Tim. Released in November, the album, titled Rock, included an unlikely cover of AC/DC's Highway To Hell. By 1998, His Majesty had transformed into Good Time Charlie with a new lead guitarist, John Botica, who had replaced Dai Pritchard (Billy Thorpe, Rose Tattoo). Good Time Charlie toured Southeast Asia and recorded an album, Adults Only, which was produced by John Robinson formerly of Australian band Blackfeather.

In October 1998 The Masters Apprentices were inducted into the ARIA Hall of Fame as the classic line-up of Burgess, Ford, Keays and Wheatley. One month later both Burgess brothers were seriously injured in a car accident while travelling to a CD launch party for Good Time Charlie – they recovered and resumed their careers. In 2005, a documentary of the brothers, The Comeback Kings, filmed by Joel Peterson was issued. Colin and Denny Burgess have performed and recorded as The Burgess Brothers Band and, as of 2014, Burgess Burgess. Colin has also been playing with a project pulled together by a guitar teacher named Steve Flack called Guitar Heroes, which showcases some of Australia's finest veteran guitarists in a blues/hard rock context outside the one in which they're usually perceived. This has seen him play with, among others, Chain's Phil Manning, Phil Emmanuel, Kahvas Jute's Dennis Wilson, The Angels' Bob Spencer, Choirboys' Brad Carr, The Radiators' Fess Parker, The Backsliders' Dom Turner and The Atlantics' Martin Cilia. Atlantics bass player from 2006 to 2012, Michael Smith, has been the project's regular live bassist since its inception in 2004.

Colin Burgess is currently part of Dead Singer Band, a tribute band.  He performs around Australia in the Dead Singer Band 'Lost Legends Showcase', a show dedicated to Australian singers who have died.

Awards and nominations

Go-Set Pop Poll
The Go-Set Pop Poll was coordinated by teen-oriented pop music newspaper, Go-Set and was established in February 1966 and conducted an annual poll during 1966 to 1972 of its readers to determine the most popular personalities.

|-
| 1970
| himself 
| Best drummer
| style="background:gold;"| 1st
|-
| 1971
| himself 
| Best drummer
| style="background:gold;"| 1st
|-

References
   
General
 "Two Sides To Every Glory", Paul Stenning, 2005
 "Metal Hammer & Classic Rock present AC/DC", Metal Hammer magazine special, 2005
  NOTE: limited preview for on-line version.

 
 NOTE: only overview for on-line version.

Specific
 

1946 births
AC/DC members
Australian rock drummers
Male drummers
Living people
The Masters Apprentices members